Marlborough College is a public school (English fee-charging boarding school) for pupils aged 13 to 18 in Marlborough, Wiltshire, England. Founded in 1843 for the sons of Church of England clergy, it is now co-educational. For the academic year 2015/16, Marlborough charged £9,610 per term for day pupils, making it the most expensive day school in the Headmasters' and Headmistresses' Conference (HMC) – the association of British independent schools.

The Good Schools Guide described Marlborough as a "famous, designer label, co-ed boarding school still riding high." The school is a member of the G20 Schools Group. A sister school in Johor, Malaysia, opened in 2012.

History
Founded in 1843 for the education of the sons of Church of England clergy, the school now accepts both boys and girls of all beliefs. Currently there are just over 900 pupils, approximately 45% of whom are female. New pupils are admitted at the ages of 13+ (Year Nine, referred to as "Shell entry") and 16+ (Lower Sixth).

Marlborough was, in 1968, the first major British independent boys' school to allow girls into the sixth form, setting a trend that many other schools followed subsequently. The school became fully co-educational in 1989. The school made a major contribution to the School Mathematics Project (from 1961) and initiated the teaching of Business Studies at A level (from 1968). In 1963 a group of boys, led by the future political biographer Ben Pimlott, wrote a book, Marlborough, an open examination written by the boys, describing life at the school. The writer and television critic T. C. Worsley wrote about predatory masters at the school in his critically acclaimed autobiography Flannelled Fool: A Slice of a Life in the Thirties.

In 2005, the school was one of fifty of the country's leading independent schools which were found guilty of running an illegal price-fixing cartel, exposed by The Times, which had allowed them to drive up fees for thousands of parents. Each school was required to pay a nominal penalty of £10,000, and all agreed to make ex-gratia payments totalling three million pounds into a trust designed to benefit pupils who attended the schools during the period in respect of which fee information was shared. Jean Scott, the head of the Independent Schools Council, said that independent schools had always been exempt from anti-cartel rules applied to business, were following a long-established procedure in sharing the information with each other, and were unaware of the change to the law (on which they had not been consulted). She wrote to John Vickers, the OFT director-general, saying, "They are not a group of businessmen meeting behind closed doors to fix the price of their products to the disadvantage of the consumer. They are schools that have quite openly continued to follow a long-established practice because they were unaware that the law had changed."

Buildings 
The college is built beside the Mound, the former motte of a Norman castle. No remains of the castle can be seen today. Radiocarbon dating of core samples in the early 2010s indicated that the origins of the Mound date from 2400 BC. This is close to the dates established for Silbury Hill.

The main focus of the college is the Court. This is surrounded by buildings in a number of different styles. At the south end is the back of an early 18th-century mansion, later converted to a coaching inn which was bought as the first building for the school. The main block of what now forms C House, it was built by Charles Seymour, 6th Duke of Somerset and is a Grade I listed building. Next to it are the old stables, now converted into boarding houses. The west side consists of the 1959 red brick dining hall, and a Victorian boarding house now converted to other purposes. The north west corner is dominated by its Victorian Gothic style chapel by the architects George Frederick Bodley and Thomas Garner which has a collection of pre-Raphaelite style paintings by John Roddam Spencer Stanhope and stained glass by Old Marlburian William Morris.

The rest of the Court is surrounded by buildings in styles ranging from the "Jacobethan" (a name coined by Old Marlburian John Betjeman) to classical Georgian and Victorian prison. The latter, B house (now just called B1), was (along with the College Chapel) designed by the Victorian architect Edward Blore, whose other works included the facade of Buckingham Palace (since remodelled) and the Vorontsovsky Palace in Alupka, Ukraine.

On the other side of the Mound is the Science laboratory, built in 1933. It is an early example of shuttered concrete construction and was listed as a building of architectural significance in 1970.

Houses
Pupils are assigned to one of the Houses on entering the school. This is where they make their home while at school. The Houses compete against one another in sports.

The Houses are divided into In-College Houses which are mostly gathered around the central Court, and Out-College Houses at sites around the western side of the town. Unusually, the older In-College Houses were not historically given names but were referred to by an alphanumeric title. Newer Houses have been given names reflecting their location or commemorating a figure from the school's past.

Names of the houses

When the College became fully co-educational in 1989, three girls' houses were opened – Morris, Elmhurst and Mill Mead; New Court was opened in 1991. Morris was moved in 1995 from A house to Field House, which had previously been occupied by B3 and C2. New houses were built to accommodate C3, which had previously shared C house with C1 (in 1989) and C2 (in 1992). In 2012, the college acquired the Ivy House Hotel in Marlborough High Street which opened as a girls' house in the autumn of that year.

Railway locomotive
In 1933, the school lent its name to one of the steam locomotives in the Southern Railway's Schools class, which were named after English public schools. The locomotive bearing the school's name (no. 922, later 30922) was withdrawn in 1961.

Masters

 1843–1851 Matthew Wilkinson
 1852–1858 George Edward Lynch Cotton
 1858–1870 George Granville Bradley
 1871–1876 Frederick William Farrar
 1876–1903 George Charles Bell
 1903–1911 Frank Fletcher
 1911–1916 St John Basil Wynne Willson
 1916–1926 Cyril Norwood 
 1926–1939 George Charlewood Turner
 1939–1952 Francis Melville Heywood
 1952–1961 Thomas Ronald Garnett
 1961–1972 John Christopher Dancy
 1972–1986 Roger Wykeham Ellis
 1986–1993 David Robert Cope
 1993–2003 Edward John Humphrey Gould
 2004–2012 Nicholas Alexander Sampson
 2012–2018 Jonathan Leigh
 2018– Louise Moelwyn-Hughes

Other notable schoolmasters
Stephen Borthwick, later head of Epsom College

Old Marlburians

Former pupils include the Nobel laureate Sir Peter Medawar, Poet Laureate Sir John Betjeman, wartime poet Siegfried Sassoon, writer Dick King-Smith, journalists Frank Gardner, James Mates, Tom Newton Dunn and Hugh Pym, YO! Sushi founder Simon Woodroffe, comedian Jack Whitehall, singers Nick Drake and Chris de Burgh, Chancellor of the Exchequer Rab Butler, Home Secretary Henry Brooke, Baron Brooke of Cumnor, Archbishop of Canterbury Geoffrey Fisher, Catherine, Princess of Wales, Pippa Middleton, Princess Eugenie of York, Samantha Cameron, fashion leaders Amanda Harlech and Stella Tennant.

See List of Old Marlburians for notable former pupils. Societies for former pupils include the Marlburian Club and the Old Marlburian Lodge (of Freemasons).

Terms
There are three academic terms in the year:
The Michaelmas Term, from early September to mid December (new boys, girls and lower-sixth candidates are now usually only admitted at the start of the Michaelmas Half);
The Lent Term, from mid January to late March;
The Summer Term, from late April to late June or early July.

Facilities

The Memorial Hall

The Memorial Hall was built to commemorate the 749 Old Marlburians who were killed in World War I. Following World War II, the names of those killed in that war were added to a memorial panel in the entrance hall.

The hall is a semi-circular auditorium of stepped seats. There is a stage at the front. Below the seats with access from the outside rear are a number of music practice rooms. The façade of the hall towards the forecourt and road has two entrance lobbies linked together by eight stone columns. The forecourt is paved with stone.

The Hall holds about 800 people so can no longer be used for assemblies of the entire school. It is now most often used for concerts and theatrical productions where the whole school is not expected to attend.

The Chapel

The current Chapel is the second to be built at the school. The first was opened in 1848 but by 1880 the school numbers had outgrown its space. After consideration of expanding the existing building, it was demolished in 1884 and a new Chapel was designed and built.

The new Chapel, designed in the Late Decorated Gothic style, was dedicated to St Michael and All Angels and was consecrated in 1886. The original colour scheme of greens and browns was much loved by Sir John Betjeman and there are twelve large Pre-Raphaelite murals by Spencer Stanhope which depict various Biblical scenes involving angels. Those on the north side show scenes from the Old Testament while the six on the south side are from the New Testament.

Two other artistic features are the Scholars' Window on the south side, which was designed by Edward Burne-Jones and made by Old Marlburian William Morris, and a sculpture of "The Virgin and Child" by Eric Gill near the west door.

In 2010, the chapel was closed owing to structural defects. After being repaired, it was declared safe to use.

Music facilities

Performance areas
All music halls and performance areas are fitted with soundproof windows which prevent sound from escaping, even while open, as well as walls engineered to prevent sound crossing at right angles. The floors of the centres also float on a bed of air, so as to maintain good soundproofing.

The Blackett Observatory

The Blackett Observatory houses a 10-inch-aperture Cooke refractor on a motorised equatorial mount. The telescope dates from 1860 and was used professionally at the Radcliffe Observatory at Oxford University. When the Observatory was relocated to South Africa in the 1930s, Sir Basil Blackett, a president of the Marlburian Club, raised the funds to purchase it and have the observatory built on the playing fields of the college.

In 1997 a restoration effort was started which was finished in 2002 when the telescope was reopened for use. It is currently used to teach astronomy and is also open to local astronomers from outside the college.

Sports facilities
A fully operational army-only CCF detachment operates at the college under the supervision of a resident SSI (school staff instructor). Weekly parades take place at the parade ground adjacent to the armoury, with occasional off-campus activities, such as range-days or overnight exercises.

Next to the CCF parade ground is a six-lane .22 rifle range. Rifle shooting has had a long history at the college, with teams representing the school since 1862.

See also
The Heretick – a magazine published by students
List of independent schools in the United Kingdom
Education in the United Kingdom
Marlborough College Malaysia
Marlborough Mound

References

Further reading 

 Hinde, Thomas (1992). Paths of progress: A history of Marlborough College. London: James & James. ISBN 0907383335.

External links 

 
 Profile on the ISC website
 Inspection reports by the Independent Schools Inspectorate
 Blackett Observatory

Boarding schools in Wiltshire
 
Racquets venues
Private schools in Wiltshire
Educational institutions established in 1843
Member schools of the Headmasters' and Headmistresses' Conference
Grade I listed buildings in Wiltshire
International Baccalaureate schools in England
1843 establishments in England
Church of England private schools in the Diocese of Salisbury
Marlborough, Wiltshire
Schools cricket